New Philadelphia High School is a public high school in New Philadelphia, Ohio, United States. Founded in 1913 as Central High School, New Philadelphia High School is accredited by the North Central Association of Colleges and Secondary Schools and the Ohio Department of Education. 91.8% of New Philadelphia High's 865 students are Caucasian/White. The school's Hispanic population is 38% and is projected to increase as younger students age into the high school. Athletic teams compete as the New Philadelphia Quakers in the Ohio High School Athletic Association as a member of the Ohio Cardinal Conference.

Academics
The Quakers' graduation rate is 90.6% for four years. 71% of the teachers at New Philadelphia high school have a master's degree. There are 12 advanced placement (AP) courses offered at the high school.

Athletics

Town rivalry
New Philadelphia and the neighboring town of Dover have maintained a competitive rivalry, but in 1968, the two schools considered merging. This idea was introduced as a way for the school district to save money but the rivalry was already so deep rooted that when the cities voted on it, it was immediately shut down. In the past, this match-up was named the "Best Small Town Rivalry" by USA Today. New Philadelphia has been quoted as "having the best football team in all of Ohio".

Ohio High School Athletic Association State Championships
 Boys basketball – 1940 
 Varsity football team is rated nationally at 309th currently.
 Varsity  is ranked 28th in the state of Ohio currently.

Extracurricular activities
In addition to sports, New Philadelphia High School students may participate in Student Council, elective clubs (Academic Challenge Team, Drama Club, Science Club, Spanish Club, French Club, Art Club, Mock Trial, and Key Club), Cheerleading and The QT's (New Philadelphia's Competitive Dance Team). In addition to clubs, Student Council, and athletic groups, New Philadelphia offers five choir groups which are Bel Canto, Concert Choir, Select Men's Chorus, Ladies Ensemble, and the Delphian Chorale (all under the direction of Mrs. Kristi Prucha).  New Philadelphia also has a band program which branches off into seven different programs which are: Competitive Marching Band, Symphonic band (all band students), Concert Band (Freshmen and Sophomores and under the direction of Mr. Jeff Phillips), Wind Ensemble (Juniors and Seniors and under the direction of Mr. Jeff Furbay), Steel Drum Band (under the direction of Mr. Jeff Phillips), Kaleidoscope (Indoor Colorguard and under direction of Ms. Lauren Rowlands), and Jazz band (Under direction of Mr. Jeff Furbay). The Marching Band competes at Ohio Music Education Association (OMEA) Local and Regional and  Grand National Championships under Bands of America (BOA).

Notable incidents
 A tornado in 1964 destroyed the press box, fence, and the refreshment stand at the stadium.  It cost about $10,165 to repair the damage that was caused.
 In 1968 two teachers, Mrs. Goforth  and Mr. Campbell, were fired. The next day the boys vocational department organized a walk out of all junior and senior high school students to support them. Despite the show of support, the Board of Education did not reconsider the terminations.  
 On March 4, 1990, an arson fire caused estimated damages of 6 million dollars to New Philadelphia High School. The fire was started in the second floor library, but also caused significant damage to the third floor room above the library and other adjacent second floor rooms. Investigators found multiple gasoline ignited piles of books in the library that served as origin points. Firefighters said that the fire was estimated to be burning about two hours in the enclosed library before being discovered around 6:49 A.M by a custodian. The Police Captain confirmed that there was a break-in at the school. The arson remains an unsolved case.  The temperature was estimated to be 2,000 degrees that caused most of the damage and the doors were closed that kept the heat in and caused the third floor to sag into the library.  In the wake of the fire, high school classes were cancelled for at least a week, until the school decided where the rest of the year was going to be held.  The High school students attended Tuscarawas Campus of Kent university and Buckeye Vocational School. The junior high school students attended local churches.

Notable faculty and staff
 Woody Hayes came to New Philadelphia in 1936 and started out as an assistant coach to head coach Brickles. He then became a head coach at New Philadelphia in 1938 and led the Quakers to a 9–1 season. For the six-year period that Woody Hayes coached the Quakers went 54–5–1. The Quakers would outscore their opponents 341 to 52 during the time Woody was coach. Hayes only remained head coach for three years and then enlisted in the navy in July 1941.

Notable alumni
 Bill "Cannonball" Cooper, professional football player, San Francisco 49ers
 Cie Grant, professional football player, New Orleans Saints
 Matt Mills, racing driver
 Eric Swinderman, Starred in the 1993 live performance of Thundecalf as The Thundecalf.

References

External links
 New Philadelphia City Schools Website
 New Philadelphia High School Website
 New Philadelphia High School on GreatSchools
 The Quaker Foundation

High schools in Tuscarawas County, Ohio
Public high schools in Ohio